Roding Valley High School is a co-educational secondary school and sixth form located in Loughton, Essex, England, founded in September 1989 by the merger of three schools.

History
Its site formerly housed Loughton County High School for Girls, and the other two schools were Buckhurst Hill County High School (for boys) and Epping Forest High School (itself formerly the Lucton school).

The school was awarded "Healthy School" status in 2007. 
The school has more than 1,200 students. and has been rated Good with Outstanding Features in the latest Ofsted report.

In September 2015, the school opened the Epping Forest Sixth Form which is listed for 16-18's within the school.

Previously a community school administered by Essex County Council, in June 2018 Roding Valley High School converted to academy status. The school is now sponsored by The Chelmsford Learning Partnership.

Staff
On 28 March 2017, it was announced that the headteacher, Mr. James Luck, had resigned via an email to the parents from the chair of governors, Paul Wershof. Sharon Jenner remains Head of School in the interim until a permanent Headteacher is in place, with Mr. Paul Banks being the Executive Head. Mr. James Luck joined the school in 2014. He replaced Mr. Paul Banks who left the school after 5 years. Prior to Mr. Paul Banks, the head teacher was Mr. Geoff Mangan who was in the post for many years.

References

External links
School website

Secondary schools in Essex
Academies in Essex
Loughton